Ajapeu Lodge is the Order of the Arrow lodge in two local councils of the Boy Scouts of America:

 Ajapeu Lodge (Bucks County Council)
 Ajapeu Lodge (Green Mountain Council)